Vega has been borne by at least two ships of the Italian Navy and may refer to:

 , a  launched in 1936 and sunk in 1941.
 , a  launched in 1990. 

Italian Navy ship names